The electoral division of Cornwall was an electoral division in the Tasmanian Legislative Council of Australia. It was abolished in 1999 after the Legislative Council was reduced from 19 members to 15.

The former division was located on the western side of the Tamar River and central Launceston. Cornwall included Legana and the Launceston suburbs of Riverside and Trevallyn, South Launceston, East Launceston, Punchbowl and Sandhill.

Most of the electorate including Legana, Trevallyn, Riverside and Grinderwald were incorporated into the Division of Rosevears. However the central Launceston suburbs became part of Paterson. At the time of its abolition, Cornwall had 18,481 enrolled voters. Of these, 8,837 were transferred to Paterson and 10,281 were transferred Rosevears.

The last member of Cornwall was Ray Bailey.

Members

See also

Cornwall Land District

Notes

After 1999 Ray Bailey was made member for Rosevears, he retired in 2002.

References

Tasmanian Legislative Council redistribution Tribunal
Parliament Tasmania - Past election results for Cornwall

Northern Tasmania
Cornwall